Holly River State Park is a state park located in Webster County, West Virginia.

History
The creation of Holly River State Park began circa 1937 with the Farm Security Administration's Kanawha Head Project to resettle families from marginal farmland. 250 Works Progress Administration workers rehabilitated the land and constructed facilities in the project area. Holly River State Park was formed in 1938 when the West Virginia Conservation Commission took control of the area, and the state obtained ownership of the site in 1954.

Recreation
Holly River features a seasonal swimming pool, a softball field, and courts for playing basketball, volleyball, tennis, and other popular activities. Special activities such as guided hikes, movie nights, and sporting events are offered during the summer.

Trails
Two trails, Ridge Road Trail and Rock Camp Trail, are designated as horse trails.

Accommodations

Cabins

Holly River features ten furnished cabins constructed in the 1930s using local natural stone and timber. Situated along a tributary of Laurel Fork Holly River, each cabin includes a stone fireplace.

Campgrounds

Holly River features a modern 88-unit campground that is open seasonally.
Several campsites are designed to accommodate equestrian users and include access to corrals.

Store and restaurant
Holly River features a small on-site store providing staple groceries and sundries. A restaurant operated by a local concessionaire is also located in the park. It has been named one of the "101 Unique Places to Dine in West Virginia" several times.

Attractions

Potato Knob
Located at 

Potato Knob Trail winds its way up the steep incline to the summit of the hill.

Upper Falls

Located at 

Located near Potato Knob is Upper Falls, a large waterfall on Fall Run.  The site features an observation deck and stairway to the base of the falls.

Windy Gap School

Located at 

Windy Gap School is a former one-room schoolhouse that was located on a remote tract of land owned by the West Virginia Division of Natural Resources.  The Holly River State Park Foundation led a volunteer project to relocate the schoolhouse to near the park headquarters to make it more accessible to visitors.

Tecumseh Falls
Located along the Reverie Trail, Tecumseh Falls was named after a Shawnee Native American prophet who predicted a solar eclipse. The falls drops  from a rock ledge that overhangs the trail. It can be best seen during winter.

Holly River Festival
The Holly River Festival has been held annually during Labor Day weekend at the park since 1992. The family-oriented festival features activities such as a talent show, live music, contests, crafts, old-time games, and exhibitions.

Accessibility
Accessibility for the disabled was evaluated by West Virginia University in 2005. The campground, picnic shelters, swimming pool, and playground were found to be accessible, but issues were identified with signage and slippery stairways.

See also
 List of West Virginia state parks

References

External links

 

State parks of West Virginia
Protected areas of Webster County, West Virginia
Protected areas established in 1938
National Register of Historic Places in Webster County, West Virginia
Parks on the National Register of Historic Places in West Virginia
Campgrounds in West Virginia
IUCN Category V